ABC Under-20 Championship for Women 2002 is ABC's basketball championship for females under 20 years old. The games were held at Shijiazhuang, China.

Preliminary round

Group A

Group B

Classification 5th–8th

7th place

5th place

Final round

Semifinals

3rd place

Final

Final standing

Awards

External links
FIBA Asia 
JABBA

2002
2002 in women's basketball
2002–03 in Asian basketball
2002–03 in Chinese basketball
International women's basketball competitions hosted by China
2002 in youth sport